The Giustino Fortunato University, often simply abbreviated as "Unifortunato", is a private for-profit online university founded in 2006 in Benevento, Italy.

History
The university was named after Giustino Fortunato, who was a famous Italian historian. The university was established on 13 April 2006.

Academics
Giustino Fortunato University provides online distance learning courses to Italians. The degrees conferred are accredited by the Italian Ministry of Education. Classes are offered online, while exams are taken at designated places.

The university offers 3-year bachelor's, 2-year master's, and 5-year single cycle master's degrees. To be admitted in the Bachelor degree programme, prospective students are required at least to have a high school diploma. Credits from previous degrees can be validated in order to shorten the time to degree.

During 2016/2017, the university has approximately 218 students and employs 54 staff lecturers and professors.

Rectors
 Aldo Loiodice
 Nicola Di Prisco
 Augusto Fantozzi
 Angelo Scala
 Giuseppe Acocella

See also
 List of Italian universities
 Benevento
 Distance education

References

External links
 

Private universities and colleges in Italy
Educational institutions established in 2006
Distance education institutions based in Italy
2006 establishments in Italy